Nibutani, or Niptani, is a district in the town of Biratori in Hokkaidō, Japan. It was once known as Pipaushi, which means "a place rich in shells." The population as of 2010 was 395 people. A particularly large proportion of the population of the district is of the indigenous Ainu ethnicity. As of 2000, over 80% of the residents were Ainu, making it the settlement with the largest percentage of its residents being Ainu in the country.

It is also the site of the Nibutani Dam, and the hometown of Shigeru Kayano. Nibutani is also the site of two Ainu museums "Kayano Shigeru Nibutani Ainu museum" and the "Nibutani Ainu Culture Museum", as well as the Nibutani Family Land.

History
In the Edo period, Hokkaidō was assigned to the provincial government of the Matsumae clan. Ainu were forced into laboring for one-seventh to one-fifth pay by Matsumae retainers, which the Ainu regarded as slavery. Nibutani Ainu were taken as slaves to Atsukeshi, over 350 kilometers away on the other side of the island. Work-related deaths had reduced the eastern population of Ainu, leading to labor relocation from the Saru and Yufutsu areas.

In 1858, according to Matsuura Takeshirō's "Saru Journal" quoted by Shigeru Kayano, the combined populations of Niputani (as it was called then), Pipaus and Kankan villages were 116 villagers among twenty-six households. Of that number, 43 were drafted for forced labor, including Kayano's grandfather Totkaram at the age of 11. Detailed information about the names, ages and households of each village were provided by the Saru Journal.

Kayano relates that it was Matsuura Takeshirō "who, angered by the cruelty of the Matsumae province and the 'location' contractors, made repeated proposals that eventually led to the abolition of forced labor."

References

Ainu geography
Geography of Hokkaido
Lands inhabited by indigenous peoples
Biratori, Hokkaido